The Lakvijaya Power Station (also known as the Norochcholai Power Station, after its location) is the largest power station in Sri Lanka.

The power station is in Norocholai, Puttalam, on the southern end of the Kalpitiya Peninsula. Construction of the facility began on 11 May 2006, with the first unit commissioning on 22 March 2011.

The plant is connected to the grid via  220-kilovolt transmission line to Veyangoda.

During its pre-development stages, protests were launched by residents living at the project site, claiming that they were deceived by the government.

Incidents 

Since its creation the power plant has faced several breakdowns. It has been alleged by the Power and Renewable Energy Deputy Minister, Ajith P. Perera, that the power plant was built with substandard and outdated material and is below international standards, and that the government is unable to claim any damages as the Rajapaksa government agreed to use the materials specified in the agreement which are sub-standard.

 A large fire broke out on 24 October 2010. According to the Ceylon Electricity Board, there were no casualties. The Ministry of Power and Energy commented that damages to the facility would be borne by the constructors and not the government or the developers.
 On 22 July 2012, the power station ceased operations due to a leak in one of the thousands of tubes carrying water between the boilers. The country was put into controlled regional power outages to cope with the missing .
 On 8 August 2012, a tripping of the powerline from Lakvijaya caused the power station to cease operations.
The plant was reactivated a day later.
 On 13 March 2016, an island-wide power outage occurred, which caused the power plant to fail.
 Technical error in generator 2 of the Norochcholai coal power plant caused an island-wide blackout on 18 March 2019. The breakdown has caused a loss of 270 MW to the national grid as the Norochcholai coal power plant fulfills 15% of Sri Lanka’s power supply.

Operation 

In the plant, the electricity is produced using a steam turbine which is capable of producing 300MW. Coal is used as the fuel to produce steam that will then be used to rotate the turbine at a speed of 3000 rpm. The coal is imported from Indonesia. The coal in India is cheaper as compared with Indonesia, but Indonesian coal is used since the Indian coal contains more sulfur. Despite this, the vessels that carry coal come from a Russian port.

At first the coal is brought from Indonesia via ships (65 tons per ship). The ships are anchored around 5 km from shore. This coal is brought in to the plant by using barges (long flat-bottomed boats) and then by conveyors.

The coal should be maintained around 10% moisture content immediately before it is used. It needs to be ground as powder before it is burnt. There are five "mills" that pulverize (grind) the coal. Four ball mills work at a time while another one is in standby.

See also 
 Electricity in Sri Lanka
 List of power stations in Sri Lanka
 Mampuri Wind Farms
 Sampur Power Station

References 

Coal-fired power stations in Sri Lanka
Buildings and structures in Puttalam District